Pyrethrin II is an organic compound that is a potent insecticide.  It is one of the two pyrethrins, the other being pyrethrin I.  Thousands of tons this mixture are produced annually from chrysanthemum plants, which are cultivated in warm climates.   Whereas pyrethrin I is a derivative of (+)-trans-chrysanthemic acid, in pyrethrin II one methyl group is oxidized to a carboxymethyl group, the resulting core being called pyrethric acid.  Knowledge of their chemical structures opened the way for the production of synthetic analogues, which are called pyrethroids.  In terms of their biosynthesis, pyrethrins are classified as terpenoids, being derived from dimethylallyl pyrophosphate.

References

Allethrins